9th Central Committee may refer to:
Central Committee of the 9th Congress of the Russian Communist Party (Bolsheviks), 1920–1921
9th Central Committee of the Bulgarian Communist Party, 1966–1971
9th Central Committee of the Chinese Communist Party, 1969–1973
9th Central Committee of the Socialist Unity Party of Germany, 1976–1981
9th Central Committee of the Polish United Workers' Party, 1981–1986
9th Central Committee of the Romanian Communist Party, 1965–1969
9th Central Committee of the Lao People's Revolutionary Party, 2011–2016
9th Central Committee of the Communist Party of Vietnam, 2001–2006
9th Central Committee of the League of Communists of Yugoslavia, 1969–1974
9th Central Committee of the Hungarian Socialist Workers' Party, 1966–1970